Blessed Virgin Mary Church is a church in Pińczów in Poland (Mirów quarter).

Pińczów County
Pińczów
Roman Catholic churches in Poland